Kawésqar (Qawasqar), also known as Alacaluf, is a critically endangered language isolate spoken in southern Chile by the Kawésqar people. Originally part of a small family, only the northern language remains. In 2009, only a handful of elderly people spoke the language, most of whom lived on Wellington Island off the southwest coast of Chile.

Phonology

Vowels

Consonants

Alphabet
The alphabet in use has the following letters: a, æ, c, c', e, f, h, i, j, k, k', l, m, n, o, p, p', q, r, rr, s, t, t', u, w, x. However, differences are reported between dialects, and some sounds are not represented.

Morphology and syntax
Kawésqar has a complex system of grammatical tense, which includes a basic morphological contrast between future, present, immediate past, recent past, distant past, and mythological past events.

See also 
 Alacalufe people
 List of endangered languages in South America

Bibliography
Aguilera Faúndez, Oscar (1978). Léxico Kawesqar-Español, Español-Kawesqar. Boletín de filología (Universidad de Chile, Facultad de Filosofía y Letras) 29.
Aguilera Faúndez, Óscar (2001): Gramática de la lengua kawésqar. Temuco: Corporación de Desarrollo Indígena.
 Clairis, Christos (1987): El qawasqar. Lingüística fueguina. Teoría y descripción. Valdivia: Universidad Austral de Chile [Anejo de Estudios Filológicos 12].
 Pieter C. Muysken.  2004.  The Languages of the Andes.  Cambridge Language Surveys.  Cambridge:  Cambridge University Press.

References

External links
Qawasqar dictionary online (select simple or advanced browsing)
Alfabeto Kawésqar
Kawésqar
SerIndigena - Territorio Kawesqar
Kawésqar at the World Atlas of Language Structures Online
Chilean Languages Collection of Oscar Aguilera and José Tonko - including recordings and transcriptions of stories, myths, and conversations in Kawésqar at AILLA.
Qawasqar (Intercontinental Dictionary Series)

Indigenous languages of the South American Cone
Languages of Chile
Alacalufan languages
Critically endangered languages
Endangered Alacalufan languages
Fuegian languages
Kawésqar